Carlota Ríos Laurenzana (26 August 1928 – December 2007) was a Mexican diver. She competed in the women's 10 metre platform event at the 1952 Summer Olympics.

Notes

References

External links
 

1928 births
2007 deaths
Mexican female divers
Olympic divers of Mexico
Divers at the 1952 Summer Olympics
Pan American Games medalists in diving
Pan American Games silver medalists for Mexico
Divers at the 1951 Pan American Games
Divers from Mexico City
Medalists at the 1951 Pan American Games
20th-century Mexican women
21st-century Mexican women